Maytime in Mayfair is a 1949 British musical romance film directed by Herbert Wilcox and starring Anna Neagle, Michael Wilding, Nicholas Phipps, and Tom Walls. It was a follow up to Spring in Park Lane.

The film was one of the most popular movies at the British box office in 1949.

Plot
The film begins with a brief history of Mayfair then shows a man walking into a florist in Shepherd Market.

Debonair Michael Gore-Brown inherits a London fashion house: Maison Londres. Knowing nothing about business or fashion, he becomes romantically involved with its beautiful manageress, Eileen Grahame, who he says reminds him of Anna Neagle. He blithely helps himself to the petty cash to buy her lunch and brings in his ex-military cousin Sir Henry as a 'business advisor'. They are interrupted by the foppish D'Arcy Davenport, Eileen's fiance.

A nearby rival fashion house learns of Eileen's new secret collection and leaks the story to the papers. It emerges that the cousin accidentally passed the story whilst drunk. Eileen angrily quits the business to work for the rival, who now plans to buy the business at a knock-down price. When she learns that Michael is about to do this, she returns to sort out the mess, and marries him.

Cast
 Anna Neagle as Eileen Grahame
 Michael Wilding as Michael Gore-Brown
 Peter Graves as D'Arcy Davenport
 Nicholas Phipps as Sir Henry Hazelrigg
 Thora Hird as Janet 
 Michael Shepley as Shepherd
 Tom Walls as Inspector Hennessey
 Max Kirby as Mr Keats
 Desmond Walter-Ellis as Mr. Shelley  
 Tom Walls Jr. as Constable 
 Doris Rogers as Lady Manbury-Logan-Manbury  
 Mona Washbourne as Lady Leveson

Costume Design

Hardy Amies 	
Charles Creed 	
Norman Hartnell 	
Mattli 	
Molyneux 	
Digby Morton 	
Bianca Mosca 	
Peter Russell 	
Victor Stiebel

Production
The film marked the fourth teaming of Anna Neagle and Michael Wilding.

After the film started shooting Tom Walls called Wilcox asking for a role. Wilcox put in a part of a policeman for the actor. Filming took place in January through to March 1949. Four lines of clothing were designed specifically for the film.

Soundtrack
Maytime in Mayfair
Music by Harry Parr Davies
Lyrics by Harold Purcell
Amor
Written by Gabriel Ruiz and Ricardo Lopez
English Lyrics by Sunny Skylar
Do I Love You?
Written by Bruno Bidoli, David Heneker and Don Pelosi
I'm Not Going Home
Written by Kermit Goell and Fred Prisker
The Moment I Saw You
Music by Manning Sherwin
Lyrics by Harold Purcell

Reception

Box Office
The film was hugely popular in Britain. The Motion Picture Herald said it was the third most watched film of the year after The Third Man and Johnny Belinda and more than Scott of the Antarctic, Paleface, Easter Parade, Blue Lagoon, Red River, The Secret Life of Walter Mitty and The Hasty Heart. Neagle and Wilding were voted the most popular stars of the year in Britain. According to Kinematograph Weekly the 'biggest winner' at the box office in 1949 Britain was The Third Man with "runners up" being Johnny Belinda, The Secret Life of Walter Mitty, Paleface, Scott of the Antarctic, The Blue Lagoon, Maytime in Mayfair, Easter Parade, Red River and You Can't Sleep Here.

However even by December 1949 the film had not recouped its cost.

Critical reception
The New York Times called the film "nauseously Technicolored flimflam";  while TV Guide noted "The plot is about as simple as they come, but it's told so nicely that you can't help but be charmed. Wilding and Neagle are a sort of British Astaire and Rogers, playing well off each other in this lighthearted romp. The beautiful fashion designs, as well as glorious set decor, are well captured in the Technicolor photography."

References

External links

Maytime in Mayfair at BFI Screenonline

1949 films
British musical comedy films
1949 musical comedy films
Films directed by Herbert Wilcox
Films about fashion in the United Kingdom
Films set in London
British black-and-white films
Films shot at MGM-British Studios
1940s English-language films
1940s British films